Arne Svendsen (11 December 1884 – 20 November 1958) was a Norwegian songwriter, actor and revue writer.

Career
Svendsen was born in Fosnes  in Nord-Trøndelag, Norway. In 1910, he left home and settled in Fredrikstad, where he first worked as a hairdresser and barber. In 1911, he wrote his first revue for the Fredrikstad Arbeiderforening, followed by five new revues annually until 1920. From 1921, Svendsen was associated with Chat Noir, a cabaret and revue theatre in Oslo. He wrote the revue, Midt i planeten together with  Per Kvist in 1922. He also collaborated with song writer Finn Bo (1927–36). From 1937 he worked with teams of various revue writers including Bias Bernhoft, Arild Feldborg and Erik Diesen. They wrote music for revues which appeared at Det Nye Teater, Carl Johan Theater, and Edderkoppen Theatre, and with more irregular intervals for Chat Noir.  He was for many years chairman of the Norwegian Comedy Writers' Association. Svendsen wrote more than 2,500 songs during his career, in addition to more than one hundred revues. Among his notable songs were Svigermor og Evensen og kjerringa og jeg (1927), first performed by Einar Rose, En liten gylden ring (1936), sung by Jens Book Jensen, and E'hel ei, e'halv ei (1955), introduced by Lalla Carlsen in the Chat Noir revue Kjør Storgata.

Personal life
Svendsen was married at age 19 to Jenny Claudine Andersen (1876-1953). That marriage was dissolved in 1933 and he married Lilly Margrethe Andersen (1902-1996). He was the father of composer and kapellmeister  (1903-1967), and singer and theatre director  (1904-1958).

He died in Oslo on 20 November 1958.

Filmography
Syv dage for Elisabeth (1927)
Simen Mustrøens besynderlige opplevelser (1926)
Til sæters (1924)

External links

References

1884 births
1958 deaths
People from Fosnes
Norwegian songwriters
Norwegian theatre people
Norwegian male poets
Norwegian male stage actors
Norwegian male film actors
Norwegian male silent film actors
20th-century Norwegian male actors
People from Namsos